Mid-South may refer to: 

 Mid-South (region), a region of the United States including portions of Tennessee, Mississippi, Kentucky, and Missouri
 East South Central States, a region of the United States
 Memphis metropolitan area, Tennessee, United States
 Mid-South Bible College, now Victory University, a Christian liberal-arts college in Memphis Tennessee
 Mid-South Coliseum, a multi-purpose arena in Memphis, Tennessee
 Mid-South Community College, a public community college in West Memphis, Arkansas
 Mid-South Conference, an American college athletics conference
 Mid South Conference (MHSAA), an American high school athletics conference in Michigan
 Mid-South District (LCMS) in the Lutheran Church - Missouri Synod
 Mid-South District of the Unitarian Universalist Association
 Mid-South Fair, a fair formerly held in Memphis, Tennessee
 Mid-South Management Company, an American newspaper company
 Mid-South Pride, an LGBT non-profit association in Memphis, Tennessee
 MidSouth Rail Corporation, now part of the Kansas City Southern Railway
 Mid-South Wrestling, an American former professional wrestling promotion
 Midsouth FC, former name of Belizean football club Nizhee Corozal